The women's 100 metres at the 2011 European Athletics U23 Championships were held at the Městský stadion on 14 and 15 July.

Medalists

Note: Darya Pizhankova of Ukraine originally won the gold medal but was later found guilty of doping offence and stripped of it.

Schedule

Results

Heats
Qualification: First 3 in each heat (Q) and 4 best performers (q) advance to the Semifinals.

Heat 1

Semifinals
First 3 in each semifinal and 2 best performers advance to the Final.

Semifinal 1

Final

Participation
According to an unofficial count, 25 athletes from 16 countries participated in the event.

References

External links

100 W
100 metres at the European Athletics U23 Championships
2011 in women's athletics